Halloweentown is a series of four fantasy films released as Disney Channel Original Movies: Halloweentown (1998), Halloweentown II: Kalabar's Revenge (2001), Halloweentown High (2004), and Return to Halloweentown (2006).

Background
Halloweentown proposes that fantasy beings such as warlocks, vampires, werewolves, mummies, ghosts, trolls, ogres, zombies, pumpkin heads (a race of people with jack-o'-lanterns for heads), skeletons, goblins, humanoids with varying numbers of heads, humanoids with varying numbers of limbs, and humanoids with varying numbers of sensory organs are real, but have separated themselves from Earth's history to escape humans' fear and persecution. These characters created their own community, "Halloweentown," a thousand years ago in an alternate universe.

Travel between Halloweentown and the ordinary, historical world (which Halloweentown residents call "The Mortal World") is only possible with magical aid, and only at regulated times (on Halloween), until the portal seals at midnight. In the second film, they permanently open the portal between the Mortal World and Halloweentown, and events of the third film breach the gap even more.

It is stated that many of the traditions of Halloween in the Mortal World are parallels based on regular traditions in Halloweentown. An example of this is how mortals wear costumes that mimic the creatures of Halloweentown, and are often depicted as being more frightening than they are naturally. In Halloweentown, the residents dress up every day, and most are much friendlier than humans generally depict them.

Although magic is present in many of the details of daily life of Halloweentown, it appears that only a limited number of persons actually practice or control magic. These people are mainly human, and are called witches (female) and warlocks (male). These beings appear human, but possess some sort of biological extra-sensory ability that allows them to harness magic unlike their "mortal" counterparts. Magic is also hereditary in their families.

The Halloweentown movies concern episodes in the lives of the Cromwell–Piper family. The family matriarch, Agatha Cromwell, has been a pillar of Halloweentown society for centuries. Her daughter, Gwen Piper, married a mortal and chose to leave Halloweentown for a life in the Mortal World. At the time of the movies, she is apparently widowed. She has decided to raise her three children (Marnie, Dylan and Sophie) apart from magic, and thus rejects contact with Halloweentown and the influence of her mother.

Films

Halloweentown (1998)

In the first film, Marnie Piper (Kimberly J. Brown), her brother Dylan (Joey Zimmerman), and her sister Sophie (Emily Roeske) discover they come from a family of witches.

Halloweentown II: Kalabar's Revenge (2001)

Two years after the first film, an angry warlock named Kal (Daniel Kountz) has stolen a magic spell book and plans to turn everyone into the costume they're wearing at midnight on Halloween.

Halloweentown High (2004)

Two years after the second film, Marnie Piper (Kimberly J. Brown) organizes a student exchange program between her mortal school and Halloweentown High. The first students to participate in this program are a witch named Cassie (Eliana Reyes), a warlock named Ethan Dalloway (Lucas Grabeel), a troll named Natalie (Olesya Rulin), and an ogre named Chester (Clayton Taylor).

Return to Halloweentown (2006)

In the fourth film, Marnie Piper (Sara Paxton) arrives at the Halloweentown University, known to everyone as Witch U. The teachers have been waiting for her arrival to fulfill a prophecy.

Future
In October 2017, producer Sheri Singer has expressed interest in doing a fifth film, but would need Disney to sign off. Actress Kimberly J. Brown has previously expressed interest on reprising her role as Marnie Piper should a fifth film ever materializes. In a 2020 interview with E!, Phillip Van Dyke expressed interest in returning for another film if the rest of the cast also returned.

Short films and other media

In 2020, Disney Channel ran a short titled Halloweentown As Told By Chibi. This continues the trend started by Big Hero 6: The Series shorts spin-off Big Chibi 6 The Shorts and continued with Amphibia and Phineas and Ferb as Chibi Tiny Tales. The first short, released September 28, 2020, simplifies the plot of the first Halloweentown. A second one titled Haircut was released on October 11, 2020, followed by a third titled First Date Fright on October 18, 2020.

In 2007, Disney produced the book “Tales From Halloweentown: The Witch’s Amulet”. It is heavily based on the fourth installment in the franchise, “Return to Halloweentown”. The ending of the book leaves plenty of room for a sequel.

Cast and characters

Additional crew and production details

Viewership ratings

References

External links

 
Comedy film series
Films about witchcraft
Children's film series
Tetralogies
Witchcraft in television
American films about Halloween
American monster movies